The fourth season of Medium, an American television series, began January 7, 2008, and ended on May 12, 2008. It aired on NBC.

Production
Renewal for a fourth season of Medium was announced on May 7, 2007, with an undetermined premiere date and number of episodes. It was the seventh series to be renewed by the network, behind solid performers Heroes and Law & Order: Special Victims Unit. One week later, the network announced that Medium would move to the Sunday 9 p.m. time slot upon its return in January 2008. News on the series' return did not come until December 2007 when NBC announced that the fourth season would begin in January in its original Monday 10 p.m. time slot, despite the WGA Strike of 2007, which forced the show to cease production, allowing for only nine episodes to be filmed. Scheduling returning mid-season shows in timeslots where they were previously successful was a pattern for NBC during the strike: Law & Order returned to Wednesdays at 10 and The Apprentice was back on Thursdays at 9:00 p.m.

Plot 
Allison's world is turned upside down after her gifts were revealed to the world at the end of the previous season. Manuel and Allison both lose their jobs and Scanlon, damaged by his closeness to Allison, is assigned demeaning public relations work by the new District Attorney Van Dyke. While struggling to balance the ever growing media attention and the visions that haunt her, Allison meets Cynthia Keener (Anjelica Huston), an investigator with "Ameri-Tips" who personally hires her to help solve crimes under the table. Somewhat of a skeptic, Cynthia has her doubts about Allison's abilities but continues to pay her for her services, until Allison begins to have dreams about Cynthia's missing daughter. The missing case becomes present when another girl goes missing in the same manner. Allison and Cynthia work together to stop the killer and put her daughter's body to rest. In a shocking twist, Cynthia murders her daughter's killer but immediately calls the police, accepting the consequences of her actions. 

Meanwhile, Joe meets his new partner at work, Megan Doyle (Kelly Preston), who begins to worry Allison when she comes onto Joe at work. But Megan's hidden intentions are revealed when she steals his idea for a new invention and he is forced to sell her the rights. At the end of the season, a sense of order is restored when Van Dyke steps down after being given only a few months to live due to cancer. Manuel returns to the office. Allison gets her job back at the District Attorney's office and the relationship between her and Scanlon is mended.

Cast and characters

Main cast 
 Patricia Arquette as Allison DuBois
 Miguel Sandoval as Manuel Devalos
 David Cubitt as Lee Scanlon
 Sofia Vassilieva as Ariel DuBois
 Feodor Lark as Bridgette DuBois
 Jake Weber as Joe DuBois

Recurring cast 
 Madison and Miranda Carabello as Marie DuBois
 Tina DiJoseph as Lynn DiNovi
 Anjelica Huston as Cynthia Keener
 Kelly Preston as Meghan Doyle
 Bruce Gray as Joe's Dad
 Kathy Baker as Marjorie Dubois
 Ned Schmidtke as Terry Cavanaugh

Episodes

References

External links 
 
 

Medium (TV series) seasons
2008 American television seasons